Sirāj ud-Dīn Muhammad ibn Muhammad ibn 'Abd ur-Rashīd Sajāwandī (Persian: محمد ابن محمد ابن عبدالرشید سجاوندی) also known as Abū Tāhir Muhammad al-Sajāwandī al-Hanafī (Arabic: ابی طاهر محمد السجاوندي الحنفي) and the honorific Sirāj ud-Dīn (سراج الدین, "lamp of the faith") (died c. 1203 CE or 600 AH) was a 12th-century Hanafi scholar of Islamic inheritance jurisprudence, mathematics astrology and geography. He is primarily known for his work Kitāb al-Farāʼiḍ al-Sirājīyah (Arabic:کتاب الفرائض السراجیه), commonly known simply as "the Sirājīyah", which is a principal work on Hanafi inheritance law. The work was translated into English by Sir William Jones in 1792 for subsequent use in the courts of British India. He was the grand-nephew of qari Muhammad ibn Tayfour Sajawandi. He lies buried in the Ziārat-e Hazrat-o 'Āshiqān wa Ārifān in Sajawand.

Name 
His full name is Sirāj ud-Dīn Abū Tāhir Muḥammad Ibn Muhammad ibn 'Abd ur-Rashīd ibn Tayfoūr Sajāwandī (Persian: سراج الدین محمد سجاوندی). His nasab, Ibn Muhammad ibn 'Abd ur-Rashīd ibn Tayfoūr refers to him being the "son of Muhammad son of 'Abd ur-Rashīd son of Tayfour". Sajāwandī is his nisbah meaning "from Sajawand". He is also known by the teknonym Abū Tāhir meaning "father of Tahir".

Works 

 Kitāb al-Farāʼiẓ al-Sirājīyah (The Sirajite Book of Inhertiance laws, کتاب الفرائض السراجیه) a.k.a. al-Sirājīyah ("The Sirajite")
 al-Tajnīs Fī al-Hasāb (The Analogy for the Calculations , کتاب التجنیس فی الحساب)
 Resālat Fī al-Jabr wa al-Muqābilah (Treatise on Algebra , رسالة فی الجبر و المقابله)

References

External links 
 Al Sirajiyyah: Or the Mahommedan Law of Inheritance. Jones, William (Calcutta, 1792)

Hanafi fiqh scholars
People from Logar Province
Ω
Mathematicians who worked on Islamic inheritance
12th-century Iranian mathematicians
1203 deaths
12th-century Arabic writers
Ghaznavid scholars
Sunni Muslim scholars of Islam